Cannabis has many different names, including more than 1,200 slang terms, and more than 2,300 names for individual strains. Additionally, there are many names to describe the state of being under the influence of the substance. This list is not exhaustive; it includes well-attested names.

The first recorded name for cannabis is the Chinese 麻 (Má), which is prehistoric.

Formal names

Strains, cultivation and preparation 

Commercial cannabis growers and retailers have given individual strains more than 2,300 names. A 2022 study in PLOS One, drawing data from  almost 90,000 samples from six US states, representing the largest quantitative chemical mapping of commercial dispensary-grade cannabis flower samples to date, found that “commercial labels do not consistently align with the observed chemical diversity.” In other words, many strain names do not necessarily reflect the actual cannabinoid content or its perceived effects.

Medical cannabis

Formal terms relating to cannabis consumption

Slang names and terms

See also

Glossary of cannabis terms
List of cannabis-related lists

References

External links
 Wikileaf: All Cannabis Strains
 Leafly: Marijuana Strains and Infused Products
 
 

 
Cannabis-related lists
 
 
Slang